Komarovo is a rural locality (a village) in Dvurechenskoye Rural Settlement, Permsky District, Perm Krai, Russia. The population was 115 as of 2010. There are 16 streets.

Geography 
It is located 41 km south-east from Ferma.

References 

Rural localities in Permsky District